Mlaka nad Lušo is a small settlement above Luša in the Municipality of Gorenja Vas–Poljane in the Upper Carniola region of Slovenia.

Name
Mlaka nad Lušo was attested in historical sources as Lak in 1291, Mlakch in 1436, Mlaka in 1478, and Namlatzi in 1500, among other spellings. The name of the settlement was changed from Mlaka to Mlaka nad Lušo in 1955. The name Mlaka is derived from the Slovene common noun mlaka 'pond', referring to the village pond or another small body of standing water.

References

External links 

Mlaka nad Lušo on Geopedia

Populated places in the Municipality of Gorenja vas-Poljane